Orson Hodge is a fictional character on the ABC television series Desperate Housewives. The character is played by Kyle MacLachlan. Orson is introduced in the final episodes of the second season of the series, and becomes the main mystery of the third season. MacLachlan left the main cast in season six, but made guest appearances until the eighth and final season.

Development and casting 
The character of Orson Hodge was planned as a romantic interest for Susan Mayer (Teri Hatcher), according to executive producer Tom Spezialy, until Cherry decided to pair Orson with Bree Van de Kamp (Marcia Cross). For the third season's mystery, series creator Marc Cherry wanted to incorporate more of the series' regular characters rather than bringing in various new ones, like they had done in the second season with Betty Applewhite (Alfre Woodard) and her family. They developed the Orson plot line around the "idea that one of our women marries a guy who has dark secrets and possibly a violent streak." Cherry opined: "I thought there was something exciting about that, but real and relatable." Greenstein commented that the writers worked backwards from the second season's cliffhangers to develop the Orson storyline, forsaking the original material that had been developed earlier. The cast responded positively to the new material for the season.

When Orson was introduced toward the end of the second season, he was to be a con artist. A character portrayed by Julie White appeared in the second-season finale and would have been Orson's accomplice, but the entire storyline was discarded in favor of the mysterious disappearance of Orson's wife and White's character was not seen or mentioned again. MacLachlan commented that his character is "desperate to make this relationship with Bree work. Anything that tries to knock that apart becomes a threat." Cherry called Orson Bree's perfect match, but added that their similarities "will ultimately prove to be the downfall of the relationship."

Storylines

Backstory
Orson Hodge was born on June 28, 1964. He was circumcised when he was 5 years old. He grew up in a very religious household. When he was sixteen, his father Edwin had an affair. When the truth came out, it caused a scandal at their church and he became an alcoholic. One day his mother, Gloria, asked Orson to stay with him, saying she had to visit a sick friend, but Orson later left because he had plans to go out with his friends. When he returned, his father had apparently committed suicide, although Orson later realizes as an adult that Gloria actually killed him. Gloria convinced Orson to spend time in a mental hospital for clinical depression, as she blamed him for his father's death. He later became a dentist.

Orson married his girlfriend, Alma, when she got pregnant. Unfortunately Alma miscarried, and Orson never came to love her, having an affair with French flight attendant Monique Polier instead. When Alma found out, she left and punished Orson by faking her own death. However, as there was no body and no evidence, no charges were brought. Alma's friend, Carolyn Bigsby, however, was constantly accusing him of killing her. Free, he tried beginning a new life with Monique, only to find her dead one night, Gloria having murdered her to punish him for cheating on Alma. He was forced to hide the body when Monique's plumber, Mike Delfino, stopped by to do some work. Gloria convinced a reluctant Orson to aid her in disposing of the body. Gloria and Orson buried Monique at the country club after Gloria removed Monique's teeth to prevent identification. During the disposal, Gloria fell into the open grave and broke her hip, resulting in her being sent to a retirement home and Orson selling her house.

When he meets Mike again, he fears that Mike might remember him, so Gloria tells him to take care of the situation.

Season 2
Orson meets Susan in the season 2 episode "Don't Look at Me". They meet at the movies, where Orson helps Susan to make Mike jealous. He then meets Bree at the mental hospital where she has self-admitted after having a nervous breakdown. When Bree sees Orson visiting an old friend, the two were attracted to each other. Their relationship is furthered when Orson helps Bree escape from the hospital to be with her daughter, Danielle. However, when Mike sees Orson for a dental exam and recognizes him from their earlier encounter at Monique's house, Orson runs Mike over with his car, putting him in a coma for the next six months. He then visits Bree, bringing her flowers that Mike had originally intended to bring to Susan.

Season 3
After six months of dating and of being in a serious relationship, Orson proposes to Bree, and she accepts. Mike no longer is of concern to Orson as he has retrograde amnesia. Unfortunately for them, Carolyn has returned. Orson and Bree marry after Bree gets Orson to come clean with her regarding Carolyn's allegations. Their wedding reception is cut short when Monique's body is dug up and the police call Orson down to the morgue to identify her. Orson pretends not to recognize Monique.

As Orson and Bree are about to go on their honeymoon, Bree cancels at the last minute upon seeing her son Andrew on TV, reduced to living in a homeless shelter. Andrew initially rejects her, but Orson persuades him to come back, making him realize Bree would hurt herself just as much as his mother otherwise.

With the police investigating Monique's death, Orson tells Bree that Carolyn's husband Harvey also had an affair with Monique, and also anonymously tells the police this information. When Bree tells Carolyn about this affair, she takes a gun to the supermarket that Harvey owns and tries to shoot him, and eventually takes customers in the store hostage, including Edie, Julie, Lynette, Austin and Nora. She kills Nora upon finding out about Nora's dispute with Lynette and Tom over custody of Kayla, prior to being killed by another customer.

Bree tries reuniting Orson with his family by finding his mother. Orson claims she was senile to avoid having to interact with her. This backfires when Gloria tries driving Bree away by revealing his affair with Monique, but the police arresting Mike for Monique's murder (due to his wrench having her blood on it) kills her suspicion that Orson was responsible. Susan, however, continues suspect Orson. Gloria then brings Alma back, proving she wasn't dead. She wants Orson back and even tries getting pregnant after faking her own suicide to lure Orson to visit her, only to then drug and rape him. Bree sides with her husband, leading Gloria to sabotage her ladder, putting her in the hospital. Andrew, thinking Orson was responsible, threatens him with meeting "bad Andrew" and Mike, now released from jail, begins remembering the night Monique died with the help of a hypnotherapist. He confronts Orson on the hospital roof and accidentally pushes him over the edge.

While Orson is in the hospital, Gloria places an unconscious Bree into the bathtub and prepares to kill her and stage the death to look like a suicide. Andrew comes to rescue her, but Gloria incapacitates him by knocking him down the stairs with her cane. As Gloria is about to slit Bree's wrists, Orson arrives, sees what Gloria is doing, realizes that she was responsible for his father's death, and tackles Gloria. In the process, Gloria then suffers a stroke, paralyzing her. Orson later discovers Alma's body outside her house after she fell from the roof trying to escape and warn someone about Gloria's plans. He puts Gloria's body next to Alma's, and plants the bag of Monique's teeth and Alma's suicide note next to them, making it look as if Alma had committed Monique's murder, and Gloria suffered a stroke upon seeing this. Afterwards, Orson visits his mother in the hospital and banishes her from his life. He and Bree then proceed to go on their honeymoon, dropping Danielle off at a convent to avoid scandal after she gets knocked up by Edie Britt's nephew Austin. When they return, it is revealed that Bree is faking a pregnancy and plans to raise Danielle's child as her and Orson's.

Season 4
Faking a pregnancy proves difficult as people keep touching Bree's belly, and the Hodges have to invent a story to explain why Bree had not noticed a fork enter her belly. They also have to deal with genuinely pregnant Susan wanting the name of Bree's ob-gyn, and Danielle's troubles, even endangering the baby's life by rollerblading. Orson wants to tell people the truth but continues pretending Bree was pregnant when she tells him that this baby is her second chance at parenting. They appear to be successful as only Phyllis Van de Kamp and Adam Mayfair find out and both agree to keep the secret. Phyllis, however, plots to get back at Bree by taking Danielle to stay and raise the child with her, using Danielle's craving for fun.

Danielle gives birth to a baby boy on Halloween. After a tearful goodbye, Danielle gives her baby to her mother. Bree and Orson name him Benjamin. When Bree wants to get Benjamin circumcised, Orson opposes it, due to bad memories of his own circumcision. However, Bree does it behind Orson's back. Orson is angry when he finds out, but forgives Bree and lets it go, although he is not happy with the decision.

After a tornado, Orson, Bree and Benjamin move in with Susan, and Orson begins sleepwalking. When Julie comes in late one night, she finds Orson murmuring, "I'm sorry I ran you over, Mike". Julie later tells Mike about Orson's confession. While Mike is willing to forgive Orson, as is Susan after some persuasion from Mike, Bree cannot, and she decides to kick him out. He stays briefly with Edie Britt before moving into the Fairview Towers apartment complex. Orson attempts to get Bree to forgive him but she refuses, telling Orson that the only way their marriage can be saved is if he turns himself in to the police, which Orson is unwilling to do.

At the conclusion of the fourth season, the series progresses five years into the future. Bree returns home from a poker game and is revealed to now be a businesswoman running a successful catering business, with Andrew as her assistant. Orson is heard upstairs revealing that he and Bree seemingly worked out their issues and remain married. Benjamin, however, is nowhere to be seen.

Five-year jump
Orson goes off to prison, where he is constantly visited by Edie Britt. After Edie tells Bree off, Bree finally visits Orson in prison. A little while after, Danielle and her new husband Leo Katz come by and take Benjamin back. When Orson returns from prison, he is furious to find that Bree let Benjamin be taken away so easily.

Season 5
Bree's success as a businesswoman and repaired marriage to Orson is explained by flashbacks showing that two years after the conclusion of the fourth season, Danielle married a lawyer named Leo Katz. Knowing she would win any custody case as Orson was in prison for running over Mike, Danielle reclaims Benjamin, her biological son, leaving Bree devastated. It is learned that Bree's success is the result of her putting the energy she had used to raise Benjamin into her work. She views her business as her "baby" and makes it her first priority.

Bree's success leaves Orson feeling unappreciated and ignored, making him become somewhat cold and changes his relationship with his wife dramatically. Orson is angry with Bree for using "Van de Kamp" in the title of her cookbook. Bree tries mollifying him by promising him a pot roast and Orson forces Bree not to, despite her returning home after midnight. Orson's criminal record makes it almost impossible to find a job. He asks Bree for one, but she refuses because her business partner, Katherine Mayfair, threatens to quit if Orson is given a job. Orson becomes upset and goes to sleep in the guest bedroom. Bree eventually relents and gives Orson a job.

Orson joins Tom Scavo's band and plays the keyboards until a fire breaks out at the White Horse Club and ends up with a broken nose. He develops a habit of stealing from his neighbors, telling Bree that it gives him a thrill. He later tells a therapist that it makes him happy because it is something Bree cannot control. While trying to steal from one of them, Rose Kemper, she catches him and hits him around the head with a baseball bat. He runs out into the street in front of Edie, who is fleeing from Dave upon finding out his true colors. Edie swerves to miss Orson and she crashes into a utility pole, and is then electrocuted by a downed power line. Orson is horrified by this but he runs away. Horrified, Bree decides to divorce Orson. She hires Karl Mayer as her divorce lawyer, who helps her stage a fake burglary of their house to hide assets she wants to keep from Orson, but Orson finds out when he discovers the storage unit she rented. He blackmails her into staying by threatening to report her to the police for insurance fraud if she goes ahead with the divorce. Later, Karl sends a hired thug to assault and threaten Orson, upsetting Bree as she did not want him harmed. Bree confronts Karl and accuses him of turning her into a different person, but Karl admits that he likes what Bree is becoming, so she fires him and they begin an affair. Bree is initially reluctant, but a passionate kiss reveals that, like Karl, Bree is enjoying the person she has become, too.

The season concludes at Mike's re-marriage to Susan two months later. Bree is seen sitting in the congregation with Orson, but turns and smiles seductively at Karl, insinuating that the two are secretly having an affair.

Season 6
Having blackmailed Bree by threatening to report her insurance fraud, Orson tries to repair their marriage by suggesting marriage counseling. Bree insists that she wants a divorce and begins an affair with Karl. Orson, however, is clueless. When Orson and Bree attend the Harvest dance together, they bump into Karl and his date Candace (a former patient of Orson's). Orson is convinced that Bree still loves him when she spills oil on the dance floor, so that Candace and Orson slip while they are dancing. Whilst Orson believes this is jealousy of him dancing with Candace, Bree is, in fact, jealous of Karl sleeping with Candace.

Relations seem to have thawed slightly between Orson and Bree when he serves her a meal at home and she tells him that someone in the service industry was rude to her, claiming it was a waitress in a cafe when it was actually a maid in a motel she visited with Karl. When Bree meets the maid again, the maid tries convincing her to end the affair as Orson seems like a good man, doing the shopping for Bree. It is clear Bree feels guilty and is upset when she sees Orson's hopeful expression at home, wanting him to snap out of it and wants to tell him that she's not worth it anymore. Orson's suspicions are aroused of Bree's affair when he goes to replace a brooch Bree had received as a gift from Karl, claiming she had gotten it at an antique store. He goes to the store only to find out it is a furniture store. Bree later assures him she got the stores mixed up, proving what trust Orson has for his wife. When Angie Bolen tells Bree what a perfect marriage she has Bree tells her that she and Orson barely speak any more and they haven't slept in the same bed for three months. Bree neglects to mention her affair with Karl, however.

Over time, Orson begins to drink and becomes increasingly depressed. He then begins to suspect that Bree is having an affair, he asks Angie to spy on her while he is on a golf weekend with some old friends. She initially refuses, believing that Bree would never do such a thing. However, Angie notices Bree become distracted when she relays Orson's suspicions to Bree and sees Bree step out to make an urgent phone call to Karl. Later, Angie sees Karl show up at Bree's house for a tryst. When Orson arrives home early and almost catches them, Angie manages to call Bree in time to warn her. Afterward when Bree thanks Angie, she coldly warns Bree that she's trying to protect Orson, because she fears that he may be suicidal. Angie pointedly asks Bree whether she truly loves Karl or Orson, and although Bree continues to tell herself that she now only loves Karl, she still seems to have lingering love for Orson. Bree finally brings to Orson photos she'd set up of him and a former cellmate, telling him to grant her a divorce or she'll have his parole revoked. To her surprise, Orson reveals he was bluffing the entire time and all Bree had to do was ask for a divorce and promises to move out. He tells Bree to wait until he's gone to tell everyone about the divorce.

During the neighborhood Christmas block party, Karl comes clean to Orson about the affair, largely in part because he has hired a private plane to fly a banner over Wisteria Lane asking Bree to marry him. The two men get into a fistfight inside a gingerbread house, which Bree tries unsuccessfully to break up. The fight is cut short when the pilot of the plane Karl hired suffers a fatal heart attack at the controls, and the plane subsequently crash-lands into the party, killing Karl and leaving Orson paralyzed (though he may walk again).

Upon being released from the hospital, Orson is unwilling to live with Bree, who still wants a divorce. He moves in with Mrs. McCluskey and Roy before returning to Bree. After settling in with Bree, Orson begins to take revenge on Bree by forcing her to do unreasonable things such as cooking a dish that takes one hour to make. When Bree confronts him as she feels she's being harassed, Orson refuses to take a bath for days and acts rude to her. Having had enough, Bree forcibly bathes him on their frontyard and Orson breaks down, saying that it's hard to do the simplest things and he has lost his independence. Bree then apologizes to him. Orson then begins to plan on killing himself. However, his plans are halted when Bree discovers his drafted suicide note and goes above and beyond to stop him. He reveals that he wants to kill himself because he feels he has no purpose in life as no one loves him, claiming Bree only stays out of obligation and guilt. When he asks Bree if she loves him, she cannot bring herself to say the words, which seemingly proves Orson right. This leads to a final confrontation at a friend's anniversary party, Bree leaves Orson alone near a pool as she goes to hear the toast. When she sees how happy the elderly couple are as they dance, she looks over to see Orson heading for the pool to drown himself. Bree then rushes to stop him and tells him she wants to fall in love with him again. They then share a passionate kiss and finally reconcile. Bree then has trouble reconnecting with Orson not only mentally but sexually, so she asks former stripper Robin Gallagher for help. Robin suggests Bree restart their sex life, prompting Bree to later try giving Orson a lap-dance. The dance proves awkward, especially when Bree falls over and Orson runs over her foot with the wheelchair. Bree explains she wants to become intimate with her husband again, and the two share a romantic moment.

When Rex's first son Sam Allen enters the lives of the Hodges, Orson is quick to side with Andrew and feels that Sam has a hidden agenda. When he finds out that Bree is being blackmailed by Sam, who is threatening to tell the Solises about how Andrew ran over Carlos's mother (unless Bree signs over her company to him) he is shocked to know what Andrew did. Orson and Andrew don't think it would be fair for Bree to give up everything she has worked for, and both think she should let Sam tell the Solises, even though Andrew would go to prison. Andrew decides it's time for him to face the consequences of his actions. Still, Bree signs over the company to Sam, resulting in Orson leaving her because he is angry at Bree's hypocrisy that she had earlier made Orson confess to the police over his crimes when she covered up Andrew's.

Season 7
Orson makes a brief return in the season seven premiere "Remember Paul?" where he and Bree sign the divorce papers, officially ending their marriage. They appear to be on relatively good terms as Bree asks Orson if he would still attend family dinners and events. Orson suggests to Bree she needs a project to keep her occupied. At first she ignores his advice but eventually she takes it and in turn meets her future boyfriend Keith Watson. Later Bree only mentioned to Richard Watson, father of Keith, that she's finally a divorcée. In "Assassins", Orson returns, claiming that Judy dumped him and Bree lets him stay with her and Keith. Over dinner, Orson makes it clear he doesn't think Keith is right for Bree as they have nothing in common and the two men have a food fight. Going to see Judy, Bree learns that Orson broke up with her as he's still in love with Bree. Confronted, Orson confesses that's true and is convinced Bree can't be happy with a man so different from her. Bree allows Orson to stay with them but insists she's changed and is fine with Keith now. As Orson does not appear in subsequent episodes, it is implied that he has left Bree's house and his current whereabouts are left unknown.

Season 8
Orson unexpectedly returns to Fairview, claiming that the girls of Wisteria Lane had called him out of concern about Bree's drinking and bed-hopping. He arrives at the parking lot of a bar just as Bree is being assaulted by a man she had turned down. Despite still being in a wheelchair, Orson uses a taser to knock the man out and tells a grateful Bree that the two were always good at cleaning each other's messes.

When Bree's friends try to see her, Orson says he happened to be passing by and saw Bree in trouble. He lies to Bree about the meeting, claiming her friends bad-mouthed her, which convinces her not to go to them to reconcile.  He convinces Bree to go away with him for the weekend and claims that he has changed ever since he learned to drive again after regaining some use of his legs.

The viewer sees that Orson has been stalking Bree for months.  He saw the girls bury Alejandro's body and left the first mysterious note in Bree's mailbox, perhaps as part of a scheme to win her back. He convinces her to go away with him on a trip but Bree insists they stop at his apartment first. Despite Orson's attempts to clean up, Bree sees a photo he took of the girls taking away Alejandro's body and realizes Orson has been watching her all this time. He also confirms he is the one who killed Chuck Vance, the detective coming close to them, insisting it was all for Bree. She says she wants nothing to do with him and better off without him. Orson calls her later to say their love requires a sacrifice and Bree assumes he's going to kill himself. Instead, Orson mails a folder filled with evidence to the Fairview Police to implicate Bree in Alejandro's murder as his final revenge against her, and then leaves town for parts unknown.

Reception
The mystery storyline of Orson in the third season received mixed reviews. Dave Anderson of TV Guide called the season premiere first-rate, while praising the comedic Bree storyline and declaring the set-up for the Orson mystery storyline ingenious. Andy Dehnart of MSNBC cited Orson's storyline as a welcomed change from the slow-moving Applewhite mystery arc. On negative reviews, TV Guide writer Matt Roush unfavorably compared the Orson character to Bree's former love interest, George Williams (Roger Bart), while Lindsay Soll of Entertainment Weekly simply labelled Orson's storyline as "confusing".

References

Desperate Housewives characters
Fictional dentists
Television characters introduced in 2006
Fictional murderers
Fictional thieves